The Holden Special Vehicles VL SS Group A SV, aka. Walky, was a limited production homologation racecar produced by Holden's performance vehicles department, HSV in Clayton, Victoria. It was HSV's debut model after Holden cut ties with the proceeding Holden Dealership Team (HDT), and has become an icon of Australian automotive manufacturing. Based on the VL series Holden Commodore, the Commodore was shipped to HSV having only the Panorama Silver Paintwork and lack of some standard equipment to determine their future, HSV then removed any further pieces and built the car up to spec by hand, this process continued to be used by HSV until its closure in 2020, 33 years later. There were initially 500 Group As slated for production, but due to demand, was extended by 250 to a total of 750, that 250 vehicle extension proved to be a bad idea, after news of the upcoming VN Commodore-based Group A was leaked.

Holden Motor Sport Injected V8 

The HSV 5000i was a Holden Engine Co. (HEC) 5L V8 engine, it was Holden's first attempt at using Fuel Injection on their V8 engines. Besides that, the initial 5000i featured twin-throttle bodies and modified internals, pushing more power out of the otherwise powerful yet somewhat lazy V8 engine, other performance modifications on this one off engine model was a custom cold-air intake, a reinforced block, exhaust headers, high flow valves and much more. The V8 produced 180kw (241 hp) at 5200rpm and 380Nm of torque at 4000rpm.

References 

HSV vehicles
Cars introduced in 1987
Cars discontinued in 1988